{{DISPLAYTITLE:Lambda1 Phoenicis}}

λ1 Phoenicis, Latinized as Lambda1 Phoenicis, is a double star in the southern constellation of Phoenix. It is visible to the naked eye as a faint, white-hued point of light with a combined apparent visual magnitude of 4.76. The system is located approximately 183 light years away from the Sun based on parallax. It is a member of the Hyades Supercluster.

The brighter component is an A-type main-sequence star with a stellar classification of A0Va. It may form a binary system of two roughly equal stars.

References

A-type main-sequence stars
Circumstellar disks
Double stars
Hyades Stream

Phoenix (constellation)
Phoenicis, Lambda1
Durchmusterung objects
002834
002472
0125